The 2018 Desert Diamond West Valley Phoenix Grand Prix was the second round of the 2018 IndyCar Series season and the first oval race of the season. It took place on April 7, 2018 at Phoenix International Raceway in Avondale, Arizona. The race was won by Josef Newgarden for Team Penske, his eighth career win and third on an oval.

Results

Qualifying

Race 

Notes:
 Points include 1 point for leading at least 1 lap during a race, an additional 2 points for leading the most race laps, and 1 point for Pole Position.

Championship standings after the race

Drivers' Championship standings

Manufacturer standings

 Note: Only the top five positions are included.

References

Desert Diamond West Valley Phoenix Grand Prix
2018 in sports in Arizona
Desert Diamond West Valley Phoenix Grand Prix